Pimlico Race Course is a thoroughbred horse racetrack in Baltimore, Maryland, most famous for hosting the Preakness Stakes. Its name is derived from the 1660s when English settlers named the area where the facility currently stands in honor of Olde Ben Pimlico's Tavern in London. The racetrack is nicknamed "Old Hilltop" after a small rise in the infield that became a favorite gathering place for thoroughbred trainers and race enthusiasts. It is currently owned by the Stronach Group.

History
Pimlico officially opened in the October 25, 1870, with the colt Preakness winning the first running of the Dinner Party Stakes. Approximately 12,000 people attended, many taking special race trains arranged by the Northern Central Railway. Three years later the horse would have the 1873 Preakness Stakes named in his honor. The track is also noted as the home for the match race in which Seabiscuit beat War Admiral in the second Pimlico Special, on November 1, 1938, before a crowd of 43,000. The capacity of the stadium is 98,983.

The most notable architectural feature of the original racetrack was the members' Clubhouse, located on the first turn. A "steamboat Gothic-era" design, the Clubhouse was topped by a weathervane that was repainted each year in the colors of the winner of the Preakness. The old Clubhouse was restored in 1956, with private rooms on the third floor named after Triple Crown winners. The President's room contained racing archives, while the second floor contained the Jockey's Hall of Fame. The building was richly decorated and housed a notable collection of racing art. The building burned down when a fire started in the front rooms on June 17, 1966. The only item salvaged was the weathervane, which was relocated to a replica Victorian cupola in the infield.

The Preakness Stakes and the Pimlico Special are run at a distance of 1-3/16 miles (9½ furlongs). The Pimlico track record for that distance is held by Farma Way, who set it while winning the Pimlico Special in 1991.

In the century and more since its opening, Pimlico Race Track has weathered much outside history including the 1904 Great Fire of Baltimore, Great Depression of the 1930s, and several notable Baltimore riots. Pimlico also survived Prohibition and even an anti-gambling movement in 1910. A bill sponsored by the state racing commission in 1949 to abandon the track was originally supported by Governor William Preston Lane Jr., who reversed his position in late March.  As Alfred G. Vanderbilt said, "Pimlico is more than a dirt track bounded by four streets. It is an accepted American institution, devoted to the best interests of a great sport, graced by time, respected for its honorable past." The races held at Pimlico, especially the Preakness, draw spectators from the Mid-Atlantic region. In 2007, the official attendance was 121,263 for the Preakness, the most people to watch a sporting event in Maryland history. More than $87.2 million in bets were made. 

On March 23, 2010, an agreement was reached to sell the two Maryland Jockey Club tracks (Pimlico and Laurel Park) from Magna Entertainment Corporation to its parent company, MI Development. On May 7, Penn National Gaming, with MI Development, announced they would jointly own and operate the Maryland Jockey Club. Penn National, which began in 1973, operating the Penn National Race Course near Harrisburg, Pennsylvania, has grown to become the largest racetrack operator in the country.

In June 2011, The Stronach Group took control of the tracks when MI Development bought out Penn National Gaming's minority stake in the Maryland Jockey Club, which owned Laurel Park Racecourse, Pimlico, and Bowie Race Track which is used as a training facility. The Stronach Group is owned by Canadian horse breeder and owner Frank Stronach, who also was MI Development's chairman and chief executive, a position he gave up in order to run Maryland's racetracks. Penn National bought a 49% stake in the Jockey Club in 2010 in hopes of securing a slots license at Laurel Park.

In February 2017, the Maryland Stadium Authority released the first phase of a study saying that Pimlico needed $250 million in renovations.

In 2018, the track began using a GPS-based timing system.

A study into a renovation was ongoing as of January 2018. A report issued on December 14, 2018 suggested the existing buildings be demolished and rebuilt. In a meeting held in June 2018 by the Maryland Stadium Authority, locals "overwhelmingly supported upgrading the track property." The Preakness Stakes took place at Pimlico in May 2019, with media reports suggesting that future Preakness races could be moved to Laurel Park.

In October 2019, The Stronach Group reached an agreement in principle with the city of Baltimore and groups representing Maryland horsemen that would permanently keep the Preakness at Pimlico. As part of the agreement, The Stronach Group would donate both Pimlico and Laurel Park to newly established government entities that would oversee the properties, with Stronach licensed to conduct the race meets. Pimlico's grandstand would be demolished and replaced with a smaller structure, and temporary seating would be added to handle the attendance during Preakness week. The race track itself would be rotated 30 degrees in order to create nine parcels of land that could be sold for private development, and new barns for horses would be constructed.

The Racing and Community Development Act, approved by the Maryland state legislature in May 2020, allows the Maryland Stadium Authority to issue $375 million in bonds for the renovation of both Stronach Group tracks.

"The Great Race"
On October 24, 1877, the United States Congress shut down for a day so its members could attend a horse race at Pimlico. The event was a 2½-mile match race run by a trio of champions: Ten Broeck, Tom Ochiltree, and Parole. Ten Broeck, the Kentucky champion, was owned by F. B. Harper. Tom Ochiltree, the Eastern champion and winner of the 1875 Preakness Stakes, was owned by George L. Lorillard, an heir to the Lorillard tobacco fortune. Parole, a gelding, was owned by Pierre Lorillard IV.

Parole, with William Barrett up, prevailed with a late run, crossing the finish line three lengths ahead of Ten Broeck and six ahead of Tom Ochiltree, which had helped to set the early pace with Barbee in the irons.

An estimated 20,000 people crowded into Pimlico to witness the event.

The event is depicted in a four-ton stone bas relief—copied from a Currier & Ives print and sculpted in stone by Bernard Zuckerman—hanging over the clubhouse entrance at Pimlico.

Description

The track has a one-mile dirt oval, surrounding a seven-furlong (7/8 mile) turf oval. There are stables for about 1,000 horses. Pimlico's capacity, including the infield, is over 120,000 people.

The track area is bounded by Park Heights and Winner Avenues to the west, West Rogers Avenue and West Northern Parkway to the north, Preakness Way to the east, and West Belvedere Avenue to the south. (Its namesake street, Pimlico Road, runs from the city line near Greenspring Avenue to Park Heights Avenue south of Cold Spring Lane, but is rendered discontinuous to through traffic between Northern Parkway and Belvedere Avenue.)

Racing
The following stakes are run at Pimlico (in order of grade, then year inaugurated):

Grade 1 Stakes Races:
 [[Preakness Stakes|The Preakness Stakes]] (1873)Grade 2 Stakes Races: Dinner Party Stakes (1870)  {formerly the Dixie Stakes}
 George E. Mitchell Black-Eyed Susan Stakes (1919)Grade 3 Stakes Races: Pimlico Special (1937)
 Gallorette Stakes (1952)
 Chick Lang Stakes (1975)
 Miss Preakness Stakes (1986)
 Maryland Sprint Stakes (1987)
 Allaire duPont Distaff Stakes (1992)Listed (ungraded) Stakes Races: James A. Murphy Stakes (1966)
 Hilltop Stakes (1973)
 Skipat Stakes (1993)
 Sir Barton Stakes (1999)
 Jim McKay Turf Sprint (2006)
 The Very One Stakes (1993)Other notable Stakes Races:' Bowie Handicap (1909)
 Geisha Stakes (1973)
 Pimlico Nursery Stakes (1910)
 Pimlico Spring Handicap (1917)
 Deputed Testamony Stakes (1986)
 William Donald Schaefer Handicap (1994)
 Henry S. Clark Stakes (2001)
 Shine Again Stakes (2006)

Non-racing events

Pimlico Race Course was the original US site for Virgin Festival from 2006 through 2008. The first was held on September 23, 2006, featuring bands The Killers, Red Hot Chili Peppers, and The Who. In 2007, it was a two-day festival (August 4–5) and featured The Police, the Beastie Boys, The Smashing Pumpkins, and Velvet Revolver. Its name was altered, to Virgin Mobile Festival'', when it returned to Pimlico on August 9–10, 2008, with five headliners: The Foo Fighters, Kanye West, Stone Temple Pilots, Jack Johnson, and Nine Inch Nails. The event moved to Merriweather Post Pavilion in 2009.

Since 2014, Pimlico Race Course has been home to Moonrise (festival), an electronic dance music festival featuring artists such as Above & Beyond, Bassnectar, and Kaskade.

Transportation
Pimlico Race Course has typically accessed  from either the Rogers Avenue Metro Station to the east in Park Heights, Baltimore, and to the west by the Mount Washington Light Rail station in Mount Washington. For major events, a shuttle is typically in place by the Maryland Transit Administration going to the race course from light rail and metro stations.

References

External links
 Pimlico Race Course Website
 Pimlico

 
Stronach Group
1870 establishments in Maryland
Sports venues completed in 1870